The Asturias autonomous basketball team is the basketball team of Asturias, Spain. The team is not affiliated to FIBA, so only plays friendly games.

History
Asturias only played one friendly game in its history. It was on 2009 at Luanco and it was defeated by Côte d'Ivoire. ACB player Saúl Blanco only could play one minute for avoiding him a possible injury due to his call up to the Spain national basketball team.

Roster

This was the roster of the Asturias team for the 2009 game.

|}
| valign="top" |
 Head coach

Legend
(C) Team captain
Club field describes pro clubduring the 2008–09 season
|}

Games played

References

External links
Asturian Federation website

Sport in Asturias
Asturias